The International Amateur Radio Club (IARC) maintains and operates the amateur radio station 4U1ITU at the International Telecommunication Union building in Geneva, Switzerland. Intended to serve as a model of amateur radio operation, the station was created under the auspices of the Secretary-General of the United Nations and the Secretary-General of the International Telecommunication Union (ITU).

In many radio contests, amateur radio operators are allowed to consider the International Telecommunication Union station 4U1ITU a special entity and because of its significance to world telecommunications and it is given similar status to a separate country when making a radio contact. No other UN location is given this honor.

See also
 International Amateur Radio Union

External links
 IARC Homepage
 4U1ITU Licence data from QRZ
 Not Your Grandfather's Amateur Radio
 ARLB024: Saturday is World Telecommunication Day
 DXCC Rules & 4U1ITU
 Radio History is Made at WRC-03 with 7-MHz Realignment Compromise
 ITU Headquarters, Europe - QSL Card Gallery

Publications

 Telecommunication Journal International Telecommunication Union Geneva, International Telecommunication Union , 

Amateur radio organizations
International Telecommunication Union
United Nations organizations based in Geneva